Go'kväll is a Swedish daily television show broadcast at Sveriges Television. The show consists of interviews, singer performances and cooking. It has had different hosts, including Anja Kontor, Suzanne Axell and Beppe Starbrink.

It was first broadcast on 30 September 1997.

References

External links 
 
 

Sveriges Television original programming